Victor Orly (born 20 February 1962) is a contemporary Ukrainian-born French painter, one of the major representatives of a new-age impressionism, the president of cultural and art association Capitale, a member of Guangdong Yuehua Painting Academy, Guangzhou, China.

Artistic biography

Orly was born Guennadi Grebniov in Kirovohrad, Ukrainian SSR, USSR (present day Kropyvnytskyi in Ukraine) in 1962. He graduated from Kirovohrad arts school and A.Pushkin Kirovohrad Pedagogical Institute. He has been living and working in France since 2004.

He started to draw in a very young age. When he was 3, he drew his first paintings on the back of two family portraits. In his school years the artist was an author and editor of satirical comics that were broadcast in a local cinema. He was awarded a grand prize in the regional contest of a political poster.

His professional artistic activity started in 1993. In this period he created several philosophical symbolic series of works that were influenced by Mikhail Vrubel, a pioneer of the Russian Symbolist movement, and Nicholas Roerich, a Russian artist and philosopher.

In the mid-90s he collaborated with the writers, editors, such as Volodymyr Panchenko, a famous literary scholar, professor of the National University of Kyiv-Mohyla Academy and Leonid Kutsenko, a regional ethnographer, professor of the Volodymyr Vynnychenko Kirovohrad State Pedagogical University. The artist worked on the design and artistic finish of the literary magazine "Vezha (The Tower)" and several ethnographic and literary books.

In 1996 Grebniov participated in the contest of the project of a great coat of arms of Ukraine.

Becoming a professional painter, working on his artistic style, Gennadi Grebniov was highly influenced by Sergiy Shapovalov, Merited Artist of Ukraine, whom Guennadi Grebniov calls his main teacher. He considers Claude Monet, Vincent van Gogh and Pablo Picasso to be his spiritual mentors.

In 2004 the artist moved to France. He began to use the pseudonym Victor Orly.

In France he receives new sources for his art development. In a short time he creates several new series of works, participates in numerous prestigious exhibitions in France, Canada, Ukraine, China. In 2013 Victor Orly becomes a member of Guangdong Yuehua Painting Academy, Guangzhou, China.
Victor ORLY practices different genres of painting: still life, landscape, romantic and symbolic figurative painting. Distinguishing characteristics of his works are dashing creative ideas, highly original style, combination of real and fantastic, bright colour palette.

Peculiar feature of the painter's art is an experiment with composition, colour, technique. Victor ORLY has worked out his own style which is based on a combination of classical, symbolic and impressionistic painting elements. The artist practices oil painting and uses palette knife technique. Original compositional findings, rich colour palette, vague details are characteristic of his art. His brush strokes are broad and energetic, often massive, always loose, sometimes translucent, and full of emotions and feelings. In China Victor ORLY is compared to kung fu master Li Xunhuan for his work with a palette knife.

Orly also practices other forms of fine arts. He is an author of decorative panel paintings, wall paintings, and ceramic goods. The artist created wall paintings for a Ukrainian restaurant "Korchma" (Marseille, France) and numerous private villas on French Riviera, restored and created wall paintings in the Virgin Mary bell-tower of the Holy Trinity Cathedral (Marseille).

Main theme of Orly's artworks in the recent years is Provence where he lives now. His landscapes, still-lives, figurative paintings depict the splendour of pristine Provence nature and beauty of ancient human creations. Victor ORLY is named an honorary ambassador of Provence for his special attention to this region and fine sense of its spirit.

Most of Victor Orly's landscapes are dedicated to water: a sea, a river, a lake, a pool, an aquarium, a rain. Main objects are large lengths of seas, bays, ports, classical and modern sailing ships, lotus, water-lilies, and sun reflections. Victor Orly uses his bold and broad brushstrokes to give a feeling of live reality to water and vibrations to reflexes.

In 2008 Orly was invited as a President of the jury for the art contest in Nans-les-Pins, France.

Orly realised a project "My trace on the planet" in terms of the international campaign "Marseille, European Capital of Culture". As a result, a beautiful panel painting sized 500 x 400 cm was created.

Public work

Orly organised personal exhibitions of the painters Sergiy Shapovalov and Andriy Lipatov in the galleries "Lada" and "Shedevr" in Kyiv.

In 2005 he founded art association "Capitale" being its president to this date. The association's work is aimed at art projects realisation. In 2006 the association organised a personal exhibition of a French ceramist Serge Moutarlier in Lada gallery (Kyiv, Ukraine). During 2007-2013 several art project for French and Ukrainian artists were organised in France, Ukraine, China.

The artist’s artworks are in museums and art academies collections:

Taras Shevchenko Museum, Toronto, Ontario, Canada

Kirovohrad Art Museum, Ukraine

Osmerkin Art-Memorial Museum, Kirovohrad, Ukraine

Zaporizhzhya Art Museum, Zaporizhzhya, Ukraine

Ling Nan Cultural Heritage Museum, Shawan, Guangzhou, China

Guangdong Yuehua Painting Academy, Guangzhou, China

Shantou Academy, China

His paintings are in private collections in France, Italy, Ukraine, Russia, Poland, the Netherlands, Belgium, Germany, Canada, China, and the United States.

Awards

Medal of Marseille, 2013

Prize of Castellet town, 2009

1st Prize of Castellet Grand Prix of Painting, 2007

Medal of International Art Exhibition "Nantes – Façade de Atlantic", 2006

1st Prize, "Neptune’s Kingdom" Exhibition, 2005

Grand prize in the Kirovohrad regional contest of a political poster, 1978

Exhibitions

Personal Exhibitions:

2013

La Maison Flotte, Sanary sur Mer, France

“Pasion of Colours”, Town-hall of Marseille, France

"Magical Palette", Guangdong Yuehua Painting Academy, Guangzhou, China

Ling Nan Cultural Heritage Museum, Shawan, China

2011

Permanent Representation of Ukraine to the Council of Europe, Strasbourg, France

Town-hall of Collète-de-Dèze, France

2010

Reception Hall of Marseille town-hall, France

Town-hall of Marseille 11-12 district, France

2009

Reception Hall of Archiepiscopate, Autun, France

IAE, Paul-Cézanne University, Aix-Marseille III, Aix-en-Provence, France

“Under Provence Sun”, Les Reformes Cathedral, Marseille, France

2005

“My Heart’s Feast”, Les Reformes Cathedral, Marseille, France

2004

Imagier Gallery, Marseille, France

Collective Exhibitions:

2013

Art Shenzhen 2013, Shenzhen, China

The 18th Guangzhou International Art Fair, Guangzhou, China

Seventh Dongguan Calligraphy and painting Collection Fair, Dongguan, China

Shanghai Art Fair 2013, Shanghai, China

Shantou Baidai Art Gallery, China

Shantou Si Yun Gallery, China

Canton International Art Fair, Guangzhou, China

1000 Art Zone Gallery, Guangzhou, China

3rd Guangzhou Arts Trade Fair, Guangzhou, China

"Symphonie of colours", Town-hall of 11-12 districts of Marseille, France

IV Fine Art Ukraine, Kyiv, Ukraine

2012

Shenzhen Art Fair 2012, Shenzhen, China

Guangdong Yuehua Painting Academy, Guangzhou, China

17th Guangzhou International Art Salon, Guangzhou, China

Canton International Art Fair, Guangzhou, China

Galerie Lafayette, Marseille, France

Palais des Art, Marseille, France

15 Beijing Art Expo 2012, Beijing, China

La valse des capians, Bandol, France

Art Shanghai, Shanghai, China

Toronto Art Expo, Toronto, Ontario, Canada

Artcoeur Gallery, St Paul de Vence, France

2011

The 16th Guangzhou International Art Fair, Guangzhou, China

Canton International Art and Collection Fair, Guangzhou, China

Consulate of Ukraine to France in Marseille, France

Grand Fair of Contemporary Art, Paris, France

«Painters’ Routes» exhibition, Saint Rémy-de-Provence, France

2010

Princess of Kyiv Gallery, Nice, France

ART SHANGHAI 2010 Exhibition «CARRE V.I.P», Shanghai, China

2009

Dragnignan Grand Prix of Fine Arts, Dragnignan, France

Castellet Grand Prix of Painting, Castellet, France

2008

Nans Les Pins Grand Prix of Painting, Nans Les Pins, France – President of Jury

Exhibition of Independent Artists, Paris, France

XXIII Exhibition of Painting and Sculpture, Les Pennes Mirabeau, France

“Women… I love you”, Toulon, France

2007

Simon salon, Marseille, France

Dragnignan Grand Prix of Fine Arts, Dragnignan, France

Castellet Grand Prix of Painting, Castellet, France

“Fantastic paintings”, Pharo Palace, Marseille, France

CARLI Small Formats, Marseille, France

10th Exhibition of Painting, Sainte-Zacharie, France

XXII Exhibition of Painting and Sculpture, Les Pennes Mirabeau, France

2006

“The City I Admire”, Marseille, France

International Art Exhibition “NANTES – FACADE OF ATLANTIC”, Nantes, France

Marseille Town hall, France

Castellet Grand Prix of Painting, Castellet, France

1st Festival “Panier Taro”, Marseille, France

TUILLIER Gallery, Paris, France

“Tarot”, Marseille, France

2005

La Valentine Golf club, Marseille, France

Septemes Les Vallons Town hall, France

“Tarot”, Marseille, France

“Neptune’s Kingdom” Exhibition, Marseille, France

2004

“Holidays and Traditions”, Marseille, France

Gallery 

Landscape

Still life

Figurative Printing

References

External links
 
 Perspectiva

1962 births
Artists from Kropyvnytskyi
20th-century French painters
20th-century French male artists
French male painters
21st-century French painters
21st-century French male artists
Living people
Ukrainian emigrants to France